Mosharrahat (also Romanized as Mosharraḩāt and Mashraḩāt; also known as Mosharrebeh and Musharhar) is a village in Mosharrahat Rural District, in the Central District of Ahvaz County, Khuzestan Province, Iran. At the 2006 census, its population was 302, in 64 families.

References 

Populated places in Ahvaz County